Confusion is caused by use of the term "oxo-degradable". Nobody puts pro-degradant additive into plastic and markets it as oxo-biodegradable, and nobody would want it, if all it does is to create fragments of plastic. There is no "oxo-degradable" plastics industry.
The scientific definitions are found in CEN (European Committee for Standardisation) Technical report CEN/TR 15351.

"Oxo-degradation" is degradation identified as resulting from oxidative cleavage of macromolecules". This describes ordinary plastics which abiotically degrade by oxidation in the open environment and create microplastics, but do not become biodegradable except over a very long period of time.  

"Oxo-biodegradation" is "degradation resulting from oxidative and cell-mediated phenomena either simultaneously or successively". this means that the plastic degrades by oxidation until its molecular weight is low enough to be accessible to bacteria and fungi, who then recycle it back into nature by cell-mediated phenomena.  These plastics are marketing as oxo-biodegradable."

"Biodegradable plastic" is another term which causes confusion and should not be used - because it could apply to two completely different types of plastic.

 Vegetable-based plastics, which are also loosely known as "bioplastics" or "compostable plastics", are tested in accordance with ASTM D6400 or EN13432 as to their ability to biodegrade under conditions found in industrial composting or biogas facilities.

 Oxo-biodegradable plastics—which are made from polymers such as polyethylene (PE), polypropylene (PP), contain a prodegradant catalyst—usually a salt of manganese or iron, and are tested in accordance with ASTM D6954 or BS8472, or AFNOR Accord T51-808, as to their ability to degrade and then biodegrade in the open environment.

Background
What is oxo-biodegradable plastic and why was it invented?
It was invented in the 1970s by Professor Scott and other polymer scientists who had realised by then that polyethylene and polypropylene could cause an environmental problem if it escaped from the waste  management processes and ended up in the open environment as litter.

So, knowing that most of it would not be collected, they discovered that if they introduced into the polyethylene or polypropylene a tiny amount of catalyst, the plastic would not start to degrade while in storage and would perform in exactly the same way as normal plastic whilst in use, but if it was discarded into the open environment it would rapidly become biodegradable, and be consumed by bacteria in the same way as nature's wastes(1).

In cricketing terms it is a long stop, to protect the environment if all else fails.

Their idea was that manufacturers would stop using ordinary plastic and would upgrade it with their new technology at little or no extra cost. Sadly, - for commercial reasons this has not happened, so the plastic continues to lie or float round the decades. Prof Scott said just before he died that if his invention had been more widely adopted there would be no ocean plastic garbage patches.

 The prodegradant catalyzes the abiotic degradation process so that Oxo-biodegradable plastic will degrade in the presence of oxygen much more quickly than ordinary plastic.The plastic material has then been converted into small-chain organic chemicals, such as ketones, alcohols, carboxylic acids, and low molecular mass hydrocarbon waxes. The remaining chemicals are no longer plastic and are biodegradable by bacteria, which are ubiquitous in the terrestrial and marine environments. The timescale for complete biodegradation at any time or place in the open environment is much shorter than for "conventional" plastics, which in normal environments are very slow to biodegrade and cause large scale harm.

Light and heat will accelerate the process, but it will continue even in dark, cold, conditions. Moisture is not necessary for oxidation, and does not prevent it.  The molecular-weight of ordinary plastic does reduce naturally over time but it take very many years - some say 100 years - before ordinary plastic ceases to be a plastic and has become biodegradable.

The prodegradant catalyzes the abiotic degradation process so that Oxo-biodegradable plastic will degrade in the presence of oxygen much more quickly than ordinary plastic.

The plastic material has then been converted into small-chain organic chemicals, such as ketones, alcohols, carboxylic acids, and low molecular mass hydrocarbon waxes(2).  These remaining chemicals are no longer plastic and are biodegradable by bacteria, which are ubiquitous in the terrestrial and marine environments. The timescale for complete biodegradation at any time or place in the open environment is much shorter than for "conventional" plastics.

Degradation is initially prevented by the presence of polymer stabilizers in the plastic, which ensure a useful service-life for the article. Once the stabilisers have been exhausted OXO-biodegradation will begin. The chemical mechanism is that of autoxidation but it is greatly accelerated by the presence of metal-catalysts, which promote the homolysis of hydroperoxides into free radicals which drive the degradation process(3). Access to oxygen is essential and OXO-degradable plastics will not degrade if buried deep in landfill.

Conventional polyethylene (PE) and polypropylene (PP) plastics will typically fragment quite quickly, but will then take decades to become biodegradable. OXO-biodegradable plastic, if discarded in the environment, will degrade to oxygenated low-molecular-weight chains (typically MW 5–10,000 amu) within 12–18 months, depending on the material (resin, resin thickness, anti-oxidants, etc.), temperature, and other factors in the environment.

Biodegradation of up to 92.74% has been observed in a soil environment within 180 days, when tested in accordance with ASTM D6954(4). OXO-degradation has been studied at the Eurofins laboratory in Spain, where on 25 July 2017 they noted 88.9% biodegradation in 121 days.

Oxo-biodegradable plastics are NOT intended as a disposal route. They are intended to be used, reused, recycled an disposed of in the same way as ordinary plastics, but will biodegrade if they get into the open environment as litter.  They should not be confused with plastics intended to biodegrade in the special conditions found in an industrial composting unit. These 'compostable' plastics use an entirely different technology, and confusion is caused by the fact that composting is so often brought into discussions of oxo-biodegradable plastic.  In fact the oxo-biodegradable industry does not consider that there is a role for plastics of any kind in the composting process.

Standards applicability
EN13432 for "compostable" plastic requires biodegradation to be tested in a laboratory (not in a compost heap) but it is sometimes suggested that oxo-biodegradable plastic should be tested in outdoor conditions.  See however the statement(6) of De Graham Swift (Vice-chairman of the Technical Committee at ASTM) who says "it has been my experience that results from laboratory testing are very likely to be reproduced in the real world. I can see not cause for concern that they would not, and have seen no evidence that they have not. 

Further, the Oxomar Project was a four year interdisciplinary study, sponsored by the French Government. The scientists reported  "The goal was to evaluate the biodegradation of OXO-bio in marine waters.

In their conclusion they reported that “We have obtained congruent results from our multidisciplinary approach that clearly shows that oxo-biodegradable plastics biodegrade in seawater and do so with a significantly higher efficiency than conventional plastics. The oxidation level obtained due to the d2w prodegradant catalyst was found to be of crucial importance in the degradation process.”

See also the report from Queen Mary University London by Rose et. al 11th February 2020(8).      Para 2.6 says “prior to testing, samples of LDPE and oxo‐LDPE were surface‐weathered in sea water for 82 days, undergoing natural variations in sunlight and UV intensity.

OXO-biodegradable plastic conforms to the American Standard (ASTM D6954) and British Standard (BS8472), which specify procedures to test degradability, biodegradability, and non-toxicity, and with which a properly designed and manufactured OXO-biodegradable product must comply. These standards contain pass/fail criteria.

There is no need to use a standard specification unless a specific disposal route (e.g. composting), is envisaged. ASTM D6400, EN13432, and Australian 4736 are standard specifications appropriate only for the special conditions found in industrial composting.

Environmental issues
Oxo-biodegradable plastic, including plastic carrier bags, will biodegrade much more quickly in the open environment than conventional plastic. Nobody has given any reason why biodegradation once commenced should stop before it is complete, even if it did not fully biodegrade it would be better than conventional plastic., which would not have biodegraded at all in that timescale.

THE MARINE ENVIRONMENT
The Oxomar project(9)  was a four-year interdisciplinary study, sponsored by the French Government. The scientists reported that “The goal was to evaluate the biodegradation of OXO-bio in marine waters. 

They concluded that “We have obtained congruent results from our multidisciplinary approach that clearly shows that oxo-biodegradable plastics biodegrade in seawater and do so with a significantly higher efficiency than conventional plastics. The oxidation level obtained due to the d2w prodegradant catalyst was found to be of crucial importance in the degradation process.”

See also the report from Queen Mary University London by Rose et. al 11th February 2020(10).  Para 2.6 says “prior to testing, samples of LDPE and oxo‐LDPE were surface‐weathered in sea water for 82 days, undergoing natural variations in sunlight and UV intensity.

LANDFILL: Oxo-biodegradable plastic is not designed to degrade in landfill. If the plastic has been taken to landfill, it has been responsibly disposed of and there is no need for it to degrade. Also, if anything biodegrades in anaerobic conditions it will generate methane, which is undesirable unless the landfill has been designed to collect the gas.  Oxo-biodegradable plastic will not become biodegradable in the absence of oxygen.
RECYLING:(11)  
•	Recyclers have to assess the level of degradation of any plastic sent for recycling whether it is oxo-biodegradable or not.  They cannot recycle ordinary plastic which has started to degrade after exposure to sunlight.
•	If the recyclate is to be used to make short-life products (eg food packaging) it does not matter whether it contains oxo-biodegradable plastic, because biodegradation is actually desirable.
•	Stabilisation is therefore necessary only for long-life products, and the producer of long-life products would stabilise them in the same way whether the recyclate contains oxo-biodegradable plastic or not. He does not need to know the proportion of oxo-biodegradable plastic in the feedstock.  This normal stabilisation would neutralise any oxo-biodegradable residue.
•	It is not necessary to separate oxo-biodegradable PE or PP from conventional PE or PP before recycling, but if so desired oxo-biodegradable masterbatch could be made visible to automatic sorting equipment by including a marker.
•	Oxo-biodegradable masterbatch is used in PE and PP, but NOT in PET.
Is recycling preferable to biodegradation?  It can be, but it is not possible to recycle plastic which has escaped into the open environment from which it cannot realistically be collected.  The ONLY way to deal with it is biodegradation.

Microplastics
Some of the microplastics found in the environment are coming from tyres and man-made fibres, but most of the microplastics are caused by the fragmentation of ordinary plastic when exposed to sunlight.  These fragments are very persistent in the environment because their molecular weight is too high for microbes to consume them, and can remain so for decades. 
This is why oxo-biodegradable plastic was invented. The plastic falls apart because the molecular chains have been dismantled and it is no longer a plastic.  (When Ellen MacArthur Foundation asked Professor Jakubowicz for his advice he made this point, but they ignored it)(12).   
The European Chemicals Agency (ECHA) were asked to study oxo-biodegradable plastic in December 2017.  They made a Call for Evidence, and they informed the BPA on 30th October 2018 after 10 months study, that they had not been convinced that it creates microplastics. ECHA have never provided a dossier to support any ban on oxo-biodegradable plastic, and there is no evidence that microplastics from oxo-biodegradable plastic have ever been found in the environment.  
It has been used for bread bags for more than ten years by the largest bread producer in the world (Bimbo bakeries) and there have been no problems with microplastics or recycling.

Controversy
The Biodegradable Plastics Association (BPA) claimed that the report was inaccurate, and pointed out that many of the organisations shown as endorsing the report aggressively promoted a rival bio-plastic technology, while many of the others whose logos appeared in the document were themselves producers of the very plastic items that get into the open environment as litter(13). The paper's conclusions were rejected by professor Ignacy Jacubowicz, who said the degradation process was not merely a fragmentation, but a change from a high molecular weight polymer to a material that can be bio-assimilated(14). 

The evidence for and against oxo-biodegradable plastic was also reviewed in November 2018 by Peter Susman QC, a deputy judge of the High Court on England, who had over 25 years experience of adjudicating cases in the technology and construction branch of the high court, involving the evaluation of expert evidence. He declared the scientific case in favour of oxo-biodegradable plastic to be "clear and compelling". Susman examined the processes of abiotic and biotic degradation of plastics, and then looked specifically at degradation in air and degradation in seawater. He concluded, in a 15-page report(15) that

It is no longer tenable to conclude that there is 'no firm evidence either way' whether oxo-biodegradable is effective. I consider that recent research provides clear and compelling evidence that oxo-biodegradable plastic is indeed effective in facilitating very significantly speedier degradation than is the case when that technology is not used.... [I] cannot imagine that such significantly speedier final degradation occurs later than 'within a reasonable time', however that the expression might be defined.... [I regard the idea that biodegradable plastics might encourage littering as] "fanciful and unreasonable".

European strategy for plastics in a circular economy
On 16 January 2018, the European Commission published its report on the use of oxo-degradable plastic. The document forms part of the European strategy for plastics in a circular economy, which was released the same day.

The Commission focused on three key issues relating to what it called oxo-degradables: the biodegradability of oxo-biodegradable plastics in various environments; the environmental impacts in relation to littering; and recycling.

This report was critically reviewed by the Biodegradable Plastics Association (formerly the Oxo-biodegradable Plastics Association) (BPA)(16) 
In its Proposal (2018/0172(COD)) for a Directive on "Reduction of the impact of certain plastic products on the environment", the EU Commission proposed various measures for reducing the quantity of plastic goods being produced, and measures for encouraging collection for recycling. Most people would support those measures, but plastic will still escape into the open environment in unacceptable quantities until such time as plastic waste has been eliminated. This is not likely to happen any time soon.
 
It is notable that the Commission’s proposal did NOT include a ban on oxo-degradable or oxo-biodegradable plastics.  This was inserted into the draft in the Environment Committee of the Parliament.
 
The BPA argued that oxo-biodegradable technology is the ONLY way to prevent the accumulation of plastic waste which has escaped into the environment; and if oxo-biodegradable technology were severely restricted in the EU, there would be unintended consequences. Some countries outside the EU could follow the EU’s lead with disastrous consequences, and much of their accumulated plastic waste would eventually find its way to the shores of Europe.

Recital (3) to the draft Directive says "Marine litter is of a transboundary nature and is recognized as a global problem." The Reis report to the European Parliament (11 October 2018) says "Every year in Europe, 150,000 tonnes of plastic are dumped into the sea. The situation is even more alarming at [the] global level, with 8 million tonnes ending up in the sea each year." Recital (5) to the draft Directive says "In the Union, 80 to 85 % of marine litter, measured as beach litter counts, is plastic, with single-use plastic items representing 50%." 

This is why the plastic needs to be urgently upgraded so that it will convert into biodegradable materials much sooner than ordinary plastic, if it does escape into the open environment, especially the oceans.
The Directive was based on the Prodi, Reis, and Demesmaeker Reports to the European Parliament, none of which provided any scientific justification for a ban. 

The BPA says  that it has never been able to understand how it was possible to impose a ban on “oxo-degradable plastic” (by Art. 5 of the Single-use plastics Directive 2019/904) without any dossier from the European Chemicals Agency (ECHA) showing any justification for any such ban.  To make matters worse, the Commission had actually asked ECHA (under Art 69 of the REACH Regulation) to study whether these products created microplastics.  ECHA received hundreds of pages of evidence but they informed the BPA on 30th October 2018 that they were not convinced that microplastics were formed.  They were instructed to terminate the study.

The Parliament and Council then proceeded to legislate, and circumvented all the safeguards against arbitrary legislation provided by Arts. 69-73 of REACH.   Could it be that there was some improper influence? 

According to the BPA “The loser here is the environment, because ordinary plastic is still being used to make products which get into the open environment every day, where they will lie or float around for decades. They should urgently be made with oxo-biodegradable technology, at little or no extra cost, so that they will biodegrade much more quickly and will not leave harmful residues.”

1-Scott, Gerald “Degradable Polymers, Principles and Applications” ISBN 1-4020-0790-6
2 ibid
3 ibid
4 Intertek 2.12.21
5 https://www.biodeg.org/subjects-of-interest/composting/   
6 https://www.biodeg.org/wp-content/uploads/2021/02/Swift-evidence-to-BEIS.pdf 
7 https://www.biodeg.org/wp-content/uploads/2021/07/Final-report-OXOMAR-10032021.pdf 
8 https://www.biodeg.org/wp-content/uploads/2022/10/QM-published-report-11.2.20-1.pdf 
9 Ibid fn 7
10 Ibid fn8
11 see https://www.biodeg.org/subjects-of-interest/recycling-2/       
12 See  https://www.biodeg.org/wp-content/uploads/2019/11/emf-report-1.pdf 
13 https://www.biodeg.org/wp-content/uploads/2019/11/emf-report-1.pdf 
14 https://www.biodeg.org/wp-content/uploads/2020/05/Reply-to-Ellen-MacArthur-Foundation-from-Prof-Ignacy-Jakubowicz-21-8-17.pdf 
15 https://www.biodeg.org/uk-judge-find-the-case-for-oxo-biodegradable-plastic-proven/ 
16 https://www.symphonyenvironmental.com/wp-content/uploads/2022/09/bpa-responds-to-european-commission-2.pdf

References

Sources

 "Environmentally Degradable Plastics Based on Oxo-biodegradation of Conventional Polyolefins". Norman C. Billingham, Emo Chiellini, Andrea Corti, Radu Baciu and David M Wiles, Paper presented in Cologne (can be obtained from Authors).
 
 Report from CIPET (India) test on Renatura OxoDegraded PE Film using ASTM D5338 demonstrates 38,5% Bio-mineralization of PE in 180 days 1991; 57(3): 678–685.

External links
 Oxo Biodegradable Plastics Federation

Biodegradation
Plastics